Eclectric may refer to:

 Eclectric (Svoy album)
 Eclectric (Psy'Aviah album)
 Eclectric, an album by Chicago a cappella